The history of beer in Indonesia started in 1929, when the Heineken beer company established its first brewery factory in Surabaya, East Java, during Dutch colonial rule of Indonesia. This was one of the earliest beer enterprise in Southeast Asia. In July 1931 the Archipel Brouwerij Compagnie (Archipelago Brewery Co.) was formed in Batavia (now known as Jakarta), by German brewer, Beck's, constructing breweries in both Singapore and Batavia. By 1960s, Indonesians developed their own local brands of beer, which includes Bintang Beer (nationalized from Heineken) and Anker Beer.

Regulations
As a Muslim majority country, alcohol industry faces ongoing opposition from Islamic parties and pressure groups in the country. Islamic dietary law prescribed prohibition against alcohol consumption. Because of various regulations, alcohol sales are declining in Indonesia.

Market shares
Currently, PT Multi Bintang Indonesia Tbk is the largest domestic brewery of Indonesia, with its Bintang Beer leading the market as the largest selling beer of Indonesia. Multi Bintang Indonesia lead the Indonesian beer market with a commanding total volume share of over 61% in 2012.

Multi Bintang is a subsidiary of Heineken Asia Pacific. In 2011, Bintang Beer won the Gold Medal for Lager Beer Category and awarded 'Champion Beer 2011' at the world's class beer competition, the Brewing Industry International Award (BIIA 2011) in London. In 2014 Bintang Radler was introduced which was the first flavoured beer produced domestically in Indonesia.

Other major beer producers are Delta Djakarta known for its Anker Beer, and PT Bali Hai Brewery Indonesia known for its Bali Hai. Indonesia also produced under license other brands including San Miguel Beer and Asahi beer.

Indonesian breweries
 PT Multi Bintang
 PT Delta Djakarta
 PT Bali Hai Brewery Indonesia
 PT Perindustrian Bapak Djenggot

See also

 Alcohol in Indonesia
 Beer and breweries by region
 Beer in Asia

References

External links

 
Indonesian alcoholic drinks